Hypodoxa leprosa is a moth of the family Geometridae first described by William Warren in 1907. It is found on New Guinea.

Subspecies
Hypodoxa leprosa leprosa
Hypodoxa leprosa incarnata Prout, 1913

References

Moths described in 1907
Pseudoterpnini